Mission Water Aerodrome  was located adjacent to Mission, British Columbia, Canada.

References

Defunct seaplane bases in British Columbia
Mission, British Columbia